The Silver Trail, officially Yukon Highway 11, is a highway in the Canadian territory of Yukon connecting the communities of Mayo and Keno City with the Klondike Highway at Stewart Crossing. It was originally built in 1950-51 as the Whitehorse–Mayo Road, and originally designated as Highway 2. The route was renumbered in 1978 as Highway 11, and in the mid-1980s was given its current name to reflect to the historic operations of silver mining in the district.

The highway is paved for the first , then continues as a gravel road to the ghost town of Elsa and onward to Keno City. A network of rural roads winds through the area including the former route of the Silver Trail, now called Duncan Creek Road, which runs from Kilometre 68.2 (Mile ) of the current Silver Trail to Keno City.

Major intersections 
The following is a list of major intersections along the Silver Trail:

See also 
 List of Yukon territorial highways

References

Yukon territorial highways